The Cedar Swamp Covered Bridge, also known as the Station Bridge and by various other names, was a historic wooden covered bridge spanning Otter Creek between Cornwall and Salisbury, Vermont.  The Town lattice truss bridge was built in 1864-1865 and added to the National Register of Historic Places in 1974.  It was destroyed by fire in September 2016.

Description and history
The Cedar Swamp Covered Bridge stood in a rural area of southeastern Cornwall and western Salisbury, connecting Cornwall's Swamp Road with Salisbury's Creek Road. It rested on abutments of marble that had were faced in concrete, and was supported near its center by a concrete pier added in 1969. Its exterior was finished in vertical board siding, which extended a short way on the inside of each portal. The portal openings were shaped as elliptical arches, and it was capped by a metal roof.

Built in 1864-65, the bridge was one of Vermont's few covered bridges which spanned town lines, and was the only surviving 19th-century covered bridge in both Cornwall and Salisbury.  Refurbished in 2007-2008, the bridge was severely damaged by fire on September 10, 2016.

See also
National Register of Historic Places listings in Addison County, Vermont
List of Vermont covered bridges
List of bridges on the National Register of Historic Places in Vermont

References

Covered bridges on the National Register of Historic Places in Vermont
Bridges completed in 1864
Wooden bridges in Vermont
National Register of Historic Places in Addison County, Vermont
Buildings and structures in Cornwall, Vermont
Buildings and structures in Salisbury, Vermont
Road bridges on the National Register of Historic Places in Vermont
Lattice truss bridges in the United States
1864 establishments in Vermont
2016 disestablishments in Vermont
Ruined bridges